Otherways Management Association Club (OMAC) is a Paris-based organisation selling what the Center for Investigative Reporting and the Organized Crime and Corruption Reporting Project (OCCRP) have called "meaningless international awards", and are more widely known as "vanity awards".

Otherways was founded in about 1996 by Lebanese businessman, Charbel S. Tabet, the president and CEO. Before founding Otherways, Tabet worked as a consult for another vanity award organization, Global Trade Leader’s Club. Tabet is also the founder and director of Foodica Best Foods, which has received awards from OMAC. 

Otherways market a number of awards:
 Diamond Eye Award for Quality Commitment & Excellence
 Global Award for Perfection, Quality & Ideal Performance
 Golden Award for Quality & Business Prestige
 Golden Europe Award for Quality & Commercial Prestige
 Majestic Falcon Award for Quality & Excellence
 Majestic Five Continents Award for Quality & Excellence
 New Era Award for Technology, Innovation & Quality
 Platinum Technology Award for Quality & Best Trade Name

References

External links

Vanity awards